Hardcore, hard core or hard-core may refer to:

Arts and media

Film
 Hardcore (1977 film), a British comedy film
 Hardcore (1979 film), an American crime drama film starring George C Scott
 Hardcore (2001 film), a British documentary film directed by Stephen Walker
 Hardcore (2004 film), a Greek drama film directed by Dennis Iliadis
 Hardcore Henry, a Russian first-person action adventure/sci-fi film directed by Ilya Naishuller of the band Biting Elbows

Music

Genres
 Hardcore punk and beatdown hardcore
 harDCore, a portmanteau abbreviation for hardcore punk music in Washington, D.C.
 Hardcore dancing, a style of dance related to moshing, sometimes performed at hardcore punk shows
 Hardcore (electronic dance music genre)
 Breakbeat hardcore
 Digital hardcore, a fusion between hardcore punk and electronic dance music
 Hardcore hip hop
 List of hardcore genres

Albums
 Hardcore (Daddy Freddy album), 2004
 Hard Core (Paul Dean album), 1989
 Hard Core (Lil' Kim album), 1996
 Hard Core (Lil' Kim mixtape), 2014
 Hardcore '81, a 1981 album by D.O.A.

Songs
 "Hardcore" (song), a 2022 song by Tove Styrke

Video games
 Hardcore gamer, a strongly-dedicated gamer.
 Hardcore mode, also permadeath, a video game mechanic which does not allow a dead character to be restored
 Hardcore (video game), original name of the 1994 game Ultracore

Other uses in media
 Hardcore (comics), a fictional character in the Marvel Multiverse
 Hardcore pornography, a form of pornography that is explicit
 Hardcore wrestling, a form of professional wrestling
 Hardcore Holly, the ring name of American professional wrestler Robert Howard (born 1963)

Technology
 Construction aggregate, often referred to as "hardcore"
 Hard core, a type of semiconductor intellectual property core
 Hard-core predicate, a concept in cryptography

See also 
 Hard Corps (disambiguation)